Tân Uyên is a provincial city of Bình Dương Province in the Southeast region of Vietnam, about 20 miles northwest of Ho Chi Minh City.

As of 2021, the city had a population of 466,053, covering an area of 192.5 km². The capital lies at Uyên Hưng.

The area has been an important local centre since the Nguyễn dynasty and French periods. It is a center of pottery production.

Administrative divisions
Tân Uyên City is divided into 10 wards (Hội Nghĩa, Khánh Bình, Phú Chánh, Tân Hiệp, Tân Phước Khánh, Tân Vĩnh Hiệp, Thái Hòa, Thạnh Phước, Uyên Hưng, Vĩnh Tân) and 2 communes (Bạch Đằng, Thạnh Hội).

References

Districts of Bình Dương province
County-level towns in Vietnam